Heptatoma is a genus of European flies belonging to the subfamily Tabaninae.

This is effectively a monotypic genus, containing the extant species Heptatoma pellucens (Fabricius, 1776): of which there are two subspecies (as shown above).  The locality of the extinct species †Heptatoma oeningensis (Heer, 1865) is also shown.

Species
Heptatoma oeningensis (Heer, 1864)
Heptatoma pellucens (Fabricius, 1777)

References

External links
 

Tabanidae
Diptera of Europe
Brachycera genera
Taxa named by Johann Wilhelm Meigen